Attilio Galassini (22 May 1933 – 1 May 2002) was an Italian footballer who played as a striker.

Career 
Galassini was a product of the S.S. Lazio youth system. In 1952, after failing to break into the senior team he played in the Promozione with F.C. Rieti. The following season he was signed by A.S. Roma, but joined Hellas Verona F.C. in the Serie B in 1955 after failing to make an appearance with Roma. During his tenure with Verona he assisted in securing promotion to the Serie A by winning the league title in the 1956–57 season. He featured in eleven matches and recorded two goals in the top flight.

In 1958, he was loaned to Ozo Mantova, where he contributed in securing the Serie C title. In 1960, he played abroad in the National Soccer League with Toronto Italia. In his debut season in Toronto he assisted in securing the double (league title & NSL Championship) for the team. He featured in a series matches for the NSL Championship final where he contributed several goals against Montreal Cantalia. 

In 1961, he signed with league rivals Toronto Roma, and secured the league title for the club. He was also named to the NSL All-Star team. After the conclusion of the 1961 National Soccer League season he played in the American Soccer League with the Philadelphia Ukrainian Nationals. In 1962, he was transferred to the Inter-Brooklyn Italians. For the remainder of the season he played in the Eastern Canada Professional Soccer League with former club Toronto Italia, and secured the ECPSL Championship. He returned to Italy after his tenure with Toronto Italia to play in Serie C with S.S. Chieti Calcio. In 1965, he returned to play with FC Rieti in Serie D.

Death 
He died on May 1, 2002 in Marghera, Venice.

Honors 
Hellas Verona F.C.

 Serie B: 1956-1957

Ozo Mantova

 Serie C: 1958-1959

Toronto Italia

 ECPSL Championship: 1962
 NSL Championship: 1960
 National Soccer League: 1960

References 

1933 births
2002 deaths
Italian footballers
Italian expatriate footballers
F.C. Rieti players
Hellas Verona F.C. players
Mantova 1911 players
Toronto Italia players
Toronto Roma players
Philadelphia Ukrainians players
Brooklyn Italians players
S.S. Chieti Calcio players
Serie B players
Serie A players
Serie C players
Canadian National Soccer League players
American Soccer League (1933–1983) players
Eastern Canada Professional Soccer League players
Serie D players
Association football forwards
Italian expatriate sportspeople in Canada
Italian expatriate sportspeople in the United States
Expatriate soccer players in Canada
Expatriate soccer players in the United States